Andretti Winery is a boutique winery in the Oak Knoll District portion of Napa, California.

History 
Begun as a "hobby" in 1996, the winery grew steadily.  Mario Andretti's interest in the wine business arose from a commemorative bottling of wine he marketed to celebrate his retirement from auto racing in 1994.  Two years later Andretti and longtime friend Joe Antonini, former CEO of Kmart (which had sponsored Andretti's racing team) purchased a  vineyard and winery in the far north part of Napa, California, where they built a Tuscan-themed winery, tasting room, and guesthouse.  The property was under development as a winery at the time, with wine under production by the former owners.

The winery then leased back the tasting room and events center. The company has no ownership stake in the nearby vineyards.

The winery is operated by a public company, Andretti Wine Group, that the founders formed in a "reverse public shell merger" in 1995.  It raised $3 million via a public offering in 1998, however it is no longer publicly traded.

Wines 
Winemaker Bob Pepi, co-founder with his father of Robert Pepi Winery (now Pepi Winery), and owner of the "Eponymous" winery, has been winemaker since the winery opened in 1996.  The winery produces a wide variety of "super-premium" category wines from grapes grown on-site and sourced from various locations in California.  It also resells a small quantity of wine imported from Italy.

See also
List of celebrities who own wineries and vineyards

References

External links 
- andrettiwinery.com - official website

Wineries in Napa Valley
Companies based in Napa County, California